Death by sawing is the act of sawing or cutting a living person in half, either sagittally (usually midsagittally), or transversely. Death by sawing was a method of execution reportedly used in different parts of the world.

Methods
Different methods of death by sawing have been recorded. In cases related to the Roman Emperor Caligula, the sawing is said to be through the middle (transversely). In the cases of Morocco, it is stated that the sawing was lengthwise, both from the groin upwards and from the skull downwards (midsagittally).

In only one case, the story about Simon the Zealot, the person is explicitly described as being hung upside-down and sawn apart vertically through the middle, starting at the groin, with no mention of fastenings or support boards around the person, in the manner depicted in illustrations. In other cases where details about the method beyond the mere sawing act are explicitly supplied, the condemned person was apparently fastened to either one or two boards prior to sawing.

Ancient history and classical antiquity

Ancient Persia
The legend of Jamshid
Jamshid was a legendary shah of Persia, whose story is told in the Shahnameh by Ferdowsi. After 300 years of blessed reign, Jamshid forgot the blessings came from God, and began demanding that he be revered as a god himself. The people rebelled, and Zahhak had him sawn asunder.
 Parysatis
Parysatis, wife and half-sister of Darius II (r. 423–405 BC) was the real power behind the throne of the Achaemenid Empire; she instigated and became involved in a number of court intrigues, made several enemies, yet had an uncanny knack for dispatching them at an opportune time. At one point, she decided to have the siblings of her daughter-in-law Stateira killed, and only relented from killing Stateira as well due to the desperate pleas of her son, Artaxerxes II. Stateira's sister Roxana was the first of her siblings to be killed, by being sawn in half. When Darius II died, Parysatis moved quickly, and was able to have the new queen Stateira poisoned; Parysatis still remained a power to be reckoned with for years after.
Hormizd IV
Hormizd IV, son of Khosrow I, was the twenty-first King of Persia from AD 579 to 590. He was deeply resented by the nobility due to his cruelties. In 590, a palace coup was staged in which his son, Khosrow II, was declared king. Hormizd was forced to watch his wife and one of his sons sawn in two, and the deposed king was then blinded. After a few days, the new king is said to have killed his father in a fit of rage.

Thracians
Thracians were regarded as warlike, ferocious, and bloodthirsty by Romans and Greeks. One of the most notorious was the king Diegylis, possibly only topped by his son Ziselmius. According to Diodorus Siculus, Ziselmius sawed several people to death and commanded their families to eat the flesh of their murdered relatives. The Thracians eventually rebelled, captured him and sought to inflict every conceivable torture upon him prior to his death.

Ancient Rome
The Twelve Tables
Promulgated about 451 BC, the Twelve Tables is the oldest extant law code for the Romans. Aulus Gellius, whose work "Attic Nights" is partially preserved, states that death by the saw was mentioned for some offenses in the tables, but that the use of which was so infrequent that no one could remember ever having seen it done. Of the retained laws in the Twelve Tables, the following concerning how creditors should proceed with debtors is found in Table 3, article 6: "On the third market-day they [the creditors] shall cut pieces. If they shall have cut more or less [than their shares], it shall be with impunity." The translator notes the ambiguity of the original text, but says that later Roman writers understood this to mean that creditors were allowed to cut their shares from the body of the debtor. If true, that would constitute dismemberment, rather than sawing.
Caligula
This method of execution was uncommon throughout the time of the Roman Empire. However, it was used extensively during the reign of Caligula when the condemned, including members of his own family, were sawn across the torso rather than lengthwise down the body. It is said that Caligula would watch such executions while he ate, stating that witnessing the suffering acted as an appetiser.
The Kitos War
The Kitos War occurred 115–117 AD, and was a rebellion by the Jews within the Roman Empire. Major revolts happened several places, and the main source by Cassius Dio claims that in Cyrene, 220,000 Greeks were massacred by the Jews; in Cyprus, 240,000. Dio adds that many of the victims were sawn asunder, and that the Jews licked up the blood of the slain, and "twisted the entrails like a girdle about their bodies".
Valens
In 365 AD, Procopius declared himself emperor, and moved against Valens. He was defeated in battle, and due to the treachery of his two generals Agilonius and Gomoarius (they had been promised they would be "shown favour" by Valens), he was captured. In 366, he was fastened to two trees bent down with force; when the trees were released, Procopius was ripped apart in the manner of the legendary execution of the bandit Sinis. The "favour" Valens showed to Agilonius and Gomoarius was to have them both sawn asunder.

Jewish tradition
Death of Isaiah
The prophet Isaiah was, according to some traditional rabbinic texts, sawn apart on orders of King Manasseh of Judah. One tradition states that he was put within a tree, and then sawn apart; another says he was sawn apart by means of a wooden saw.

Christian martyrs
Simon the Zealot

Several early Christians are credited with being martyred by means of a saw. The earliest, and most famous, is the obscure apostle of Jesus, Simon the Zealot. He is said to have been martyred in Persia, and that the express mode by which he was executed was to be hanged up by the feet, as in the woodcut illustration.
Conus and his son

According to the Acta Sanctorum, after his wife's death in the age of Domitian, Conus went with his 7-year-old son into a desert. He destroyed several pagan idols in Cogni, Asia Minor (Anatolia). When caught, he and his son were tortured by starvation and fire, and were finally put to the saw, praying while they died.
Symphorosa and her seven sons

According to the 16th-century Foxe's Book of Martyrs, Symphorosa was a widow with seven sons living in the age of emperor Trajan (98-117) or Hadrian (117–138). Refusing a command to pray at a heathen temple, Symphorosa was scourged, and then thrown in the river Aniene with a large stone fastened to her. The six eldest sons were all killed by stab wounds, and the youngest, Eugenius, was sawn apart.

The 38 monks and martyrs on Mount Sinai

According to the Martyrologium Romanum, during the reign of Diocletian "wild barbarians" decided to rob a community of monks living at Mount Sinai. There was nothing of material wealth there, and in their rage, the Arabs slaughtered them all, several by flaying, others by sawing them with dull saws.
St. Tarbula

Accused of practising witchcraft and causing the sickness of the wife of the ardently anti-Christian Persian king Shapur II, Tarbula was condemned and executed by being sawn in half in the year 345.

Africa

Egypt
The monk from Montepulciano
In the 1630s, there are several reports from the Levant and Egypt that monks were killed. One of them, Brother Conrad d'Elis Barthelemy, a native of Montepulciano is said to have been sawn in two, from the head downwards.
 The renegade Coptic governor
Writing in 1843, William Holt Yates speaks of a governor under Muhammad Ali (r.1801–49), Abd-ur-Rahman Bey, who was said to be particularly cruel and avaricious. He was a renegade Copt, and abused his position to gain hold of wealth. He is even credited with having sawn people in two. Yates further supplies the detail: "This fellow has since been assassinated-report says, with sanction and approval of the Government"

Morocco
1705 The sawing of Alcaide Melec
One of the most notorious cases of sawing as execution is that of the Alcaide (castellan/governor) Melec under Sultan Moulay Ishmael (r. 1672–1727). The fullest description of this execution is found in Dominique Busnot's 1714 work Histoire du règne de Mouley Ismael, although a brief notice of the event can be found in the January 1706 edition of Present state of Europe. In the following, the tale as told by Busnot will be given.

Melec was judged as the chief rebel to be punished in a rebellion instigated by one of the Sultan's sons, Mulay Muhammad. In particular, according to Busnot, the Sultaness was incensed that Melec had personally beheaded one of her cousins, Ali Bouchasra. In September/October 1705, Mulay Ismail sent for his chief carpenter and asked if his saws were capable of sawing a man in two. The carpenter answered "Sure enough". He was then given the grisly task, and before he left, he asked him whether Melec should be sawn across or along the length. The emperor said the sawing should proceed lengthwise, from the head downwards. He told, however, Boachasra's sons, they should follow the carpenter and decide for themselves how best to take revenge upon the murderer (i.e., Melec) of their father. Taking with him 8 of the public executioner's assistants, the master carpenter went to the prison where Melec was held, two of his brand new saws packed in cloth, in order to keep from Melec information of the intended manner of execution. Melec was now placed on a mule, bound with an iron chain, and led to the public square, where some 4000 of his relatives and members of his tribe were assembled. These made a "terrifying" spectacle through screaming, and clawing their faces in a public display of grief. Melec, on the other hand, seemed unperturbed, calmly smoking from his tobacco pipe. When taken down from the mule, Melec's clothes were removed, damning letters "proving" his treason was cast in the fire.

Then, he was strapped onto a board, and placed upon a saw-bench, his arms and legs fastened. The executioner's team then sought to start by sawing him from the head downwards, but Boucasra's sons intervened, and demanded that one began between Melec's legs instead, because otherwise, he would die too quickly. Under the terrible screams of Melec and his relatives, thus began his execution. Once they had sawn him up to the navel, they pulled out the saw in order to commence from the other side. Melec is said to have been still conscious, asking for some water. His friends, though, thought it best to hasten his demise and shorten his sufferings, and the executioners went on, sawing him from skull to navel so he fell apart. In the process, chunks of flesh were ripped out by the saw's teeth, causing blood to splatter everywhere, thus making the execution quite unbearable to watch.

Around 300 other conspirators were impaled alive, and another report states that in addition to these, some other 20 chief conspirators had their arms and legs sawn off, and left to expire in the marketplace.
1721 The sawing of Larbe Shott
19 July 1721, a noble descended from the Andalusian Moors, Larbe Shott was put to the saw. He had spent considerable time at Gibraltar, and one of the crimes imputed to him was to have spent time in Christian kingdoms without his emperor's leave. Furthermore, he had been found guilty of defiling himself with Christian women, and often drunk alcohol. In short, he was charged as an apostate and unbeliever, in addition to being charged with having invited the "Spaniards" to invade Barbary (i.e., treason). They brought him to one of the gates in the city, fastened him between two boards, and sawed him in two, from the skull downwards. After his death, Mulay Ishmael pardoned him, so that his body could be picked up and given a decent burial at least, instead of being eaten by the dogs.

Americas
Swiss sawing
In 1757, a French officer was executed by his men in a mutiny on Cat Island in current-day Mississippi. Three of the mutineers were eventually captured and brought to New Orleans for trial. After conviction, two of the mutineers died on the French wheel. The last mutineer, a Swiss from the Karrer regiment, was allegedly, nailed into a coffin-shaped wooden box, and it was sawn in two with a cross-cut saw. This claim of a Swiss being sawn in two was first made by the French captain and traveller Jean Bernard Bossu in his 1768 Nouveaux Voyages aux Indes Occidentales, translated into English by Johann Reinhold Forster in 1771.

Commenting on Bossu's general reliability in a footnote to his essay A Map within an Indian Painting?, jurist Morris S. Arnold says the following: "Bossu's books contain a lot of tall tales, so one needs to be cautious about relying on him". Bossu claims that being "sawed asunder" was a traditional Swiss military punishment, and alleges that one Swiss mutineer actually committed suicide to avoid that punishment. Therefore, the one who was allegedly sawn in half had his punishment as governed by Swiss military law, rather than French. An incident from 1741 (in Louisbourg, Canada) shows that at that time, when two Frenchmen and a Swiss were executed, Swiss mercenary troops had been placed under French military law, rather than under Swiss. Furthermore, detailing the recorded executions in the Swiss Canton of Zürich through the 15th-18th century, Gerold Meyer von Knonau records 1445 executions in total, none of them being through death by sawing.
Haitian revolution
In August 1791, a great slave revolt broke out at Saint-Domingue, eventually leading to Haitian independence. In the process, some 4,000 white planters and their family members were massacred. One of the victims was a carpenter by trade, Robert. The rebels decided he "should die in the way of his occupation" and accordingly fastened him between two boards and sawed him apart.

Asia

Levant
An episode from the Crusades
In 1123, Joscelin de Courtenay and Baldwin II were separately ambushed and surprised by a Turkish emir, Balac, and made prisoners at the castle at Quartapiert. Some 50 Armenians, bound by oath to Joscelin as Count of Edessa, decided to free their liege lord as well as Baldwin II. Dressed as monks and pedlars, they gained entry in the town where the two nobles were held captive, and managed, through massacre, to take control of the castle. Joscelin slipped out in order to raise a force, while Baldwin II and his nephew Galeran remained behind to hold the castle. Apprised of the capture of the castle, Balac sent quickly a force to recapture it, and Baldwin II saw no possibility of holding it. Graciously, Balac took Baldwin and his nephew merely prisoners. Not so merciful was he towards the Armenians: Several of them were flayed, others buried up to the neck and used as target practice, the rest were sawn apart.
The Assassins
The Assassins, a misnomer for the Nizari, an Ismaili sect, had an independent kingdom in the Levant during the age of the Crusades, and were feared and loathed by Muslims and Christians alike. The Jewish traveller Benjamin of Tudela, travelling the region around 1157 notes that the Assassins were reputed to saw in two the kings of other peoples, if they managed to capture them.

Ottoman Empire
A number of accounts exist where the Ottomans are said to have sawn persons in two, most of them said to occur in Mehmed the Conqueror's reign (1451–81).
1453 conquest of Constantinople
A number of cruel excesses against the populace of Constantinople is said to have happened in the wake of the taking of the city. according to one rendering of the tale:
1460 Capture of Mystras
After the last Despot of Morea, Demetrios Palaiologos in 1460 switched allegiance to the Turks and gave them entry to Mystras, a tale grew up that the actual castellan at the castle of Mystras was ordered sawn in two. This tale was "well known" in later centuries, whatever actual veracity.
1460 Michael Szilágyi
In 1460, the Hungarian general Michael Szilágyi was seized by the Turks, and since he was regarded as a traitor and spy, he was sawn in half at Constantinople.
 1460-64 campaigns and slaughter in the Morea
In the following years, inhabitants in Greece under the Venetians fought several battles in the Morea. In 1464, for example, a small city is said to have been subdued, and 500 prisoners sent to Constantinople. There, they were put to the saw, according to one account.
1463 conquest of Mytilene, Lesbos
The Knights Hospitallers, then stationed at Rhodes, sent several knights to aid in the defence of Mytilene from the Turks. They eventually surrendered, under promise of having their lives spared. Instead, according to some reports, they were sawn asunder. According to Kenneth Meyer Setton, the sultan had actually promised to spare the heads of some 400 knights, and sawed them in half to keep his oath of not harming the heads.
1469/1470 conquest of Negroponte
The Triarchy of Negroponte, a Crusader state or Stato da Màr under control of the Republic of Venice, was extinguished by the capture of the city in 1469/1470, and the governor Paolo Erizzo, is said to treacherously to have been ordered sawn in two, after have being promised his life would be spared. The sultan, Mehmed the Conqueror, is said to have cut off the head of Erizzo's daughter by his own hands, because she would not yield to his desires.
1473 the arsonist at Gallipoli
In 1473, a Sicilian called Anthony, is said to have managed set fire to the sultan's ships at the Sanjak of Gelibolu, Gallipoli. After being captured at Negroponte, he was brought before the sultan who asked him what harm had been done to him that he performed such an evil deed? The young man answered that he simply wanted to harm the enemy of Christianity in some glorious way. The sultan is said to have ordered that Anthony should be sawn in two.
1480 invasion of Otranto
In 1480, the Ottomans, led by Gedik Ahmed Pasha, invaded mainland Italy, occupying Otranto. A general massacre, of disputed magnitude, occurred. Archbishop Stefano Pendinelli was, by some reports, ordered to be sawn in half.
1611 revolt of Dionysius the Philosopher
Dionysius the Philosopher led an eventually unsuccessful revolt against the Ottomans, seeking to establish a power base at Ioannina. Dionysius was flayed alive, and his skin, stuffed with straw, was sent as a present to the sultan, Ahmed I, at Constantinople. The other principal conspirators were said to be punished in various ways, some were burnt alive, others impaled, and yet others sawn asunder.
The mythologized death of Rhigas, the protomartyr of Greek independence
Rigas Feraios (1760–98), was an early Greek patriot, whose struggle for independence of Greece preceded with about 30 years the general uprising known as the Greek War of Independence. His actual manner of death has garnered many tales; Encyclopædia Britannica 1911, for example, states that he was shot in the back. Yet others state that he was strangled. Some 19th century stories report that he was sawn in two. Finally, one source asserts he was beheaded.

Mughal Empire

The Sikh Bhai Mati Das, a follower of the 9th guru, Guru Tegh Bahadur was in 1675 AD ordered executed by emperor Aurangzeb, along with several other prominent Sikhs, including their Guru, because the Guru was resisting the forceful conversion of Kashmiri Pandits into Islam. Bhai Mati Das was sawn in half, the others in different manners.

Burma
Several reports state that even in the 1820s, sawing criminals in two was an occasional punishment in Burma for "certain offences". The criminals were fastened between two planks prior to the sawing. However, this might possibly have been conflated by reports of disembowelment, for which eyewitness reports exist.

The Burmese general Maha Bandula is said to have had one of his high-ranking officers sawn in two, due to some act of disobedience, the person being fastened between two planks for that purpose.

Vietnam
Martyrdom of Augustin Huy
On occasion, a confusion of reports may exist where, for example, performed post-mortem indignities are misinterpreted as the actual manner of execution:

In 1839, the governor of Vietnam's Nam Định Province summoned five hundred soldiers to a banquet to pressure them into trampling upon a cross in renunciation of Christianity. Most of the guests complied, but three Catholic soldiers refused. One of the Vietnamese Martyrs, Augustin Huy, is reported by some sources to have been sawn in two. Others report that he was hacked to death, or cut in two. But, a letter from 1839, just three weeks after the execution 12 June, states that he was beheaded:

Imperial China
Technique
The movement of a saw may cause a body to sway back and forth making the process difficult for the executioners. The Chinese overcame this problem by securing the victim in an upright position between two boards firmly fixed between stakes driven deep into the ground. Two executioners, one at each end of the saw, would saw downwards through the stabilized boards and enclosed victim. Whether sawing as an execution method actually existed, or that cases referred to are garbled accounts of the "slow slicing" method of execution will remain an open question.
Tang dynasty
The emperor Zhaozong of Tang (r. 888–904) is said to have commanded one of his prisoners sawn asunder.
Qing dynasty
When the last emperor of the Ming dynasty committed suicide in 1644, the new emperor had one of the previous regime's strongest supporters, Chen, said to be viceroy of Canton, sawn in two. However, growing in popularity in his martyrdom, the new regime condemned the execution of Chen, declared him to have been a holy man, and erected a pagoda in Canton for his memory.

Cambodia
Khmer Rouge
Sawing a person in half vertically was one of many execution method used by the Khmer Rouge on infamous Tuol Sleng prison and killing fields. Guards tied turned up bodies on trees or special poles to saw the Chams, vietnamese, captured foreigners or suspected crades in half. The sawn remains and organs were either left on display to decorate the trees, power poles and buildings tied or impaled on Meat hook or had their organs consumed inside a wine cup.

Europe

Spain
Morisco revolt
In the aftermath of the destruction of the last Islamic kingdom in Spain, Granada in 1492, the Moriscoes, the descendants of Muslims and those who still were, in secret, adherents of Islam, felt increasingly persecuted. In 1568, the Morisco revolt broke out, under leadership of Aben Humeya. The crushing of the revolt was extremely bloody, and at Almería 1569, the historian Luis del Marmol Carvajal states that one Morisco was sawn apart alive.
La Mancha rebellion

In the Spanish rebellion of 1808 against the occupying French forces, reports exist that some French officers were sawn in two. In one of those reports, it is colonel Rene (or Frene) who met this fate. In another report, Rene was merely thrown into a kettle of boiling water, whereas the officers Caynier and Vaugien were the ones sawn in two.

Russia
1812 the Grande Armée
After the Fire of Moscow in September 1812, the French Grande Armée had not exactly endeared itself to the local population. The peasant population is said to have become embittered, fanaticized, and even developed an effective guerrilla. In addition, the "wild Cossacks" lurked about, and both groups of Russians could be a deadly enemy to solitary French soldiers. Some of those unfortunates are said to have been sawn apart.

Hungary
1848 Revolution
The Hungarian Revolution of 1848 was a bitter struggle where atrocities were committed against others of different ethnicities and of different religious persuasions. A decidedly partisan pamphlet from 1850, Ungarns gutes recht (The well-founded right of Hungary) from 1850, states that in the struggles around Banat, some 4,000 Serbians, spurred on by the preaching of the Metropolitan of Karlovci, Josif Rajačić, committed heinous deeds against the Hungarians. Women, children and old men were mutilated, roasted over slow fires, some sawn apart.

Cultural references

Tortures in Hell
Hindu mythology
In Hindu lore, Yama is the god of death. He determines the punishments to those who were wicked in life. Those guilty of robbing a Brahmin, are to be sawn apart while being in Naraka (Hell).
Chinese mythology
Sawing people asunder is one of the punishments said to occur in Buddhist Hell, and the priests knew how to make a visible spectacle of sufferings in the beyond, by commissioning artists to make paintings the populace were meant to see and reflect upon:

Segare la vecchia
In Italy and Spain, a curious tradition of "segare la vecchia" ("sawing the old woman") was upheld on Laetare Sunday (Mid-Lent Sunday) in hamlets and towns, well into the 19th century. The custom consisted of the boys running about to find the "oldest woman in the village", and then make a wooden effigy in her likeness. Then, the wooden figure was sawn across the middle. The folklorist Jacob Grimm regards this as an odd spring ritual, in which the "old year"/winter is symbolically defeated. He also notes that a rather similar custom existed in his day among Southern Slavs.

References

Bibliography

 
 
 
 
 
 
 
 
 
 
 
 
 
 
 
 
 
 
 
 
 
 
 
 
 
 
 
 
 
 
 
 
 
 
 
 
 
 
 
 
 
 
 
 
 
 
 
 
 
 
 
 
 
 
 
 
 
 
 
 
 
 
 
 
 
 
 
 
 Web resources
 
 
 
 

Torture
Sawing